The 2018 Mubadala World Tennis Championship was a non-ATP/WTA-affiliated exhibition tennis tournament. It was the 11th edition of the Mubadala World Tennis Championship with the world's top players competing in the event, held in a knockout format. The prize money for the winner was $250,000. The event was held at the International Tennis Centre at the Zayed Sports City in Abu Dhabi, United Arab Emirates.

Novak Djokovic (world number 1) and Rafael Nadal (number 2) received byes to the semi-final.

Champions

Men's singles
  
  Novak Djokovic def.  Kevin Anderson 4–6, 7–5, 7–5

Women's singles 
  Venus Williams def.  Serena Williams 4–6, 6–3, [10–8]

Players

Men's singles

During the tournament
  Rafael Nadal → replaced by  Dominic Thiem (for a third place match against  Karen Khachanov)

Women's singles

References

External links
Official website

World Tennis Championship
2018 in Emirati tennis
World Tennis Championship
December 2018 sports events in Asia